The Indestructibles is a 2006 British Documentary series made for the BBC.

The show involves four characters, Doc Damage, Data Girl and the Petri Twins, who experiment on themselves to uncover the secrets of the human body.

Presenters

Doc Damage

Played by Jonathan Goodwin

The main character of the show who usually performs the stunts.

He puts his life on the line to figure out how the stunts work and tries to push his body to the limit.

Data Girl

Played by Victoria Kruger

A researcher who finds people who have done or been involved in body stunts and impressive shows of strength. Where possible, the stunt artists will be invited to demonstrate the feat. In other episodes, experts are brought in to describe and explain historical stunts.

The Petri Twins

Played by Jamie Hull & Richard Hull

A set of identical twin brothers who compete against each other in various challenges in which the brothers will attempt different approaches to the same task in an attempt to take advantage of their identical genetic composition. Often the challenges are related to the production of bodily fluids, including saliva and semen, or physically harming one another. The winner of each challenge is either given a reward or spared an undesirable forfeit.

The twins are identified by the colour of their shirt.

References

External links
 

2006 British television series debuts
2006 British television series endings